WOWT (channel 6) is a television station in Omaha, Nebraska, United States, affiliated with NBC and owned by Gray Television. The station's studios are located at the Kiewit Plaza on Farnam Street near downtown Omaha, and its transmitter is located on a "tower farm" near North 72nd Street and Crown Point Avenue in north-central Omaha.

WOWT is Gray's only Nebraska station not to be part of its Nebraska News & Weather Network (consisting of sister stations KOLN/KGIN, KSNB-TV, KNEP, and KNOP-TV).

History
The station signed on the air on August 29, 1949, at noon as WOW-TV; it was the first television station in Nebraska and is one of the oldest in the Upper Midwest. It also claims to have gone on the air earlier than any station in four other Midwestern states—Iowa, Kansas, North Dakota and South Dakota. The station was owned by Radio Station WOW, Inc., alongside WOW radio (590 AM, now KXSP, and 92.3 FM, now KEZO). The owners operated under a United States Supreme Court ruling which had forced the Woodmen of the World, who had founded WOW in 1923, to divest itself of the radio stations because they threatened the Woodmen's tax-exempt status.

The station was originally a primary NBC affiliate and secondary ABC affiliate; it lost ABC programming in 1953, when KFOR-TV signed on from Lincoln as an ABC affiliate. However, in 1954, Lincoln was separated from the Omaha market, and WOW-TV resumed sharing ABC programming with KMTV (channel 3) until 1957, when KETV signed on as an ABC affiliate. Meredith Corporation bought WOW-AM-FM-TV in 1951. The station claims it was bought by former Secretary of the Navy Francis P. Matthews in 1954, but this is false as Matthews had died two years earlier. In 1956, after the radio stations dropped their longtime affiliation with the NBC Red Network in favor of the CBS Radio Network, WOW-TV switched affiliations with KMTV and became Omaha's CBS television affiliate. This was part of CBS' multi-year, five-station affiliation deal with Meredith Corporation, as a compensation for Phoenix sister station KPHO's initial loss of the CBS affiliation to KOOL-TV (now KSAZ) before it reclaimed that affiliation in 1994 (KCMO-AM-FM-TV also switched to the network several months earlier).

WOWT's most famous former employee is former Tonight Show host Johnny Carson, who worked at WOW-TV in the early 1950s in his first television job as host of a program called The Squirrel's Nest, in which he told jokes. Another prominent former employee is former ABC Good Morning America reporter Steve Bell, who worked for Channel 6 during the early and mid-1960s. He was the only local reporter to go to Dallas in November 1963 to cover the aftermath of the John F. Kennedy assassination. Bell left channel 6 in 1967 to join ABC News, where he remained until 1986.

In 1974, Meredith tried to sell WOW-TV to Pulitzer Publishing Company for $8 million, but the deal collapsed and Pulitzer ended up buying KETV instead.

When Meredith sold channel 6 to the San Francisco-based Chronicle Publishing Company in 1975, it changed its call letters to WOWT on July 9, due to Federal Communications Commission (FCC) restrictions regarding the usage of the same call letters by different owners at the time. Normally, channel 6 would have had to adopt a callsign starting with "K" when it changed its call letters, since the WOW call letters had been assigned before the current K/W dividing line was moved to the Mississippi River. However, Chronicle wanted to continue trading on the WOW calls, and got a waiver from the FCC to retain a "W" in its calls. To this day, WOWT is one of the westernmost stations with a callsign starting with "W." After negotiations with the network, Channel 6 reversed the 1956 swap and rejoined NBC on June 29, 1986.

Not surprisingly, channel 6 owns a lot of firsts in the market. It was the first Omaha station to broadcast local programming in color, starting in the mid-1950s; it was the first station to provide live reports during its daily newscasts; it was the first of the three local stations to broadcasts three live daily newscasts, at 5, 6, and 10 p.m.; and in 1993, WOWT was the first local television station to offer a website. During the analog era, WOWT-TV was relayed in Clarinda, Iowa on a UHF repeater, K58AE, which has since been shut down and deleted from the FCC database.

In 1999, Chronicle sold its media holdings (including its newspapers and four television stations) to separate buyers; WOWT was sold to Benedek Broadcasting via LIN TV Corporation in a three-way deal for WWLP in Springfield, Massachusetts; three years later, Benedek Broadcasting was bought out by current owner Gray Television. WOWT would later reunite with some former sister stations after being separated for 46 years when former owner Meredith was acquired by Gray in 2021.

Even though Lincoln is located in a different market, most Lincoln-area cable systems carried WOWT, and channel 6's analog signal decently covered Lincoln. It even went as far as to include Lincoln in its legal IDs. When direct broadcast satellite gained more penetration KHAS-TV (now KNHL) in Hastings, long the NBC affiliate for the western half of the Lincoln market, was offered as the local NBC affiliate. However, most Lincoln cable systems opted to continue carrying WOWT. With the acquisition of KSNB-TV in Superior by Gray, that station took over the primary local NBC affiliation and WOWT's place on the Lincoln Time Warner Cable (now Charter Spectrum) system. Until 2016, WOWT was carried in standard definition on digital channel 83 in Lincoln and surrounding Spectrum systems. As of today, it is no longer available in Lincoln.

On January 7, 2015, Gray Television stations WOWT, WIBW (Topeka, Kansas), and KAKE (Wichita, Kansas; no longer owned by them) were dropped from Cox cable lineups as a retransmission deal expired. The previous agreement expired on December 31, but a one-week extension was agreed upon before the current blackout. After a dispute lasting several days, a new agreement was reached on January 11, 2015 and the three Gray Television stations returned to Cox cable lineups.

62O
In October 2005, WOWT launched a second digital subchannel operating as a UPN affiliate, and branded as "UPN Omaha". The subchannel became an independent station branded as "62O", when The WB and UPN shut down in September 2006 (former WB affiliate KXVO (channel 15) now carries WB and UPN successor The CW, while Fox affiliate KPTM (channel 42) carries MyNetworkTV on its second digital subchannel). After that, 6.2 affiliated with Universal Sports; in advance of that network switching exclusively to a cable and satellite channel, WOWT dropped Universal Sports on October 1, 2011, replacing it with a local weather service known as "The Weather Authority Channel", an affiliate of The Local AccuWeather Channel. KETV (channel 7) dropped The Local AccuWeather Channel one month before when it switched its second subchannel to MeTV.

Programming
Syndicated programs broadcast on WOWT include Jeopardy!, Dr. Phil, and Inside Edition. Between 2016 and 2019 with Antenna TV on its third subchannel, it aired nightly repeats of The Tonight Show Starring Johnny Carson; as mentioned above, Carson grew up in Norfolk, Nebraska and started his career with WOWT.

Omaha is one of the few markets in the United States where Jeopardy! and its sister show Wheel of Fortune are telecast on separate stations (the latter airs on ABC-affiliated KETV).

News operation

WOWT presently broadcasts 40 hours of locally produced newscasts each week (with seven hours each weekday and 2½ hours each on Saturdays and Sundays); in regards to the number of hours devoted to news programming, it is the highest local newscast output among the Omaha market's broadcast television stations.

In 1991, WOWT rebranded its newscasts from Action News 6 to Channel 6 News. In 1995, WOWT launched a cable news channel called "NEWS on ONE", which featured live simulcasts and taped rebroadcasts of the station's newscasts on Cox Communications channel 1; the channel was eventually rebranded as "News 4 You", concurrent with its move to Cox channel 4 in 2009. Also in 1995, WOWT's sports department launched a weekly half-hour sports news program titled Channel 6 Sunday Sports Extra, which aired after the station's 10 p.m. newscast on Sunday evening. It was the only program of its kind in Omaha, and was hosted from its inception by sports producer (now sports director) Ross Jernstrom. In 2006, WOWT lost its longtime spot in first place in most timeslots to KETV, who remains there as of 2020. And in October 2013 the news products were re-branded WOWT 6 News. On July 16, 2018, WOWT re-added a 4 p.m. newscast on weekdays, competing with KMTV's newscast at that time slot. WOWT had been the first Omaha station to have a 4 p.m. newscast, launching it in 1994. Its current moniker is "6 On Your Side".

Technical information

Subchannels
The station's digital signal is multiplexed:

Mobile DTV channels
WOWT shut down its Mobile DTV signals at the end of 2015 in favor of offering an additional subchannel, Antenna TV, over-the-air. Antenna TV went live on 6.3 on January 18, 2016.

Analog-to-digital conversion
WOWT shut down its analog signal, over VHF channel 6, on February 17, 2009, as part of the federally mandated transition from analog to digital television (which Congress had moved the previous month to June 12). The station's digital signal remained on its pre-transition UHF channel 22, using PSIP to display WOWT's virtual channel as 6 on digital television receivers. WOWT and PBS member station KYNE (part of the Nebraska Public Media TV network) were the only two stations in the Omaha market to shut down their analog signals on the original deadline.

Upon the switch to digital, WOWT aired a 60-second farewell video bookending the analog era from beginning to end. It began with the words "Welcome to the Future", followed with archived film footage of WOW-TV's transmitter being turned on 1949 as it was covered by then-sister station WOW radio (now KXSP), outdoor scenes set to the song "America the Beautiful", and concluded with the station logo and digital call sign WOWT-DT Omaha set to the NBC chimes.

As part of the SAFER Act, WOWT kept its analog signal on the air temporarily to inform viewers of the digital television transition through a scrolling message. Voiceover artist Charlie Van Dyke provided narration: "Sixty years ago, WOWT turned on its analog signal to be the first television station in Omaha. Now, join us for the digital age as we shut off our analog signal and transition to digital television. We look forward to the new journey ahead. This is WOWT, Channel 6."

References

External links

WOWT's analog farewell video at YouTube

NBC network affiliates
Cozi TV affiliates
Heroes & Icons affiliates
Ion Television affiliates
Start TV affiliates
Circle (TV network) affiliates
Gray Television
Television channels and stations established in 1949
Television stations in Omaha, Nebraska
Woodmen of the World